Filip Kraljević (born December 13, 1989) is a Croatian professional basketball player currently playing for Široki of the  and the Bosnian basketball championship and ABA League Second Division. He plays at center position.

Playing career
Kraljević started playing basketball at the age of 16 in his hometown Široki Brijeg. Shortly after, he moved to the Cibona junior team. The first two years of his senior career he spent on a loan in Rudeš in the A-2 League. At the age of 20 he signs with Cedevita but spends most of his contract on loan in their reserve team Mladost (A-2 League) and in Zabok (A-1 Liga).  In the Summer of 2012 he signs with Split where he spent one season after which he signed with Zadar.

In August 2016, Kraljević leaves Croatia to sign with Spanish club CAI Zaragoza. In January 2021, he signed with Zadar for his third stint with the club.

In August 2022, Kraljević returned to Široki, signing a two-year contract.

National team career
Kraljević was part of the Croatian national team at the 2009 FIBA Europe Under-20 Championship. He was part of the preliminary Croatian national squad  for the 2016 FIBA World Olympic Qualifying Tournament in Turin but did not make the final roster.

References

External links
 Filip Kraljević at euroleague.net
 Filip Kraljević at abaliga.com
 Filip Kraljević at Draft Express

1989 births
Living people
ABA League players
Basket Zaragoza players
Basketball players from Mostar
Centers (basketball)
Croatian expatriate basketball people in Spain
Croatian men's basketball players
HKK Široki players
KK Cedevita players
KK Cibona players
KK Split players
KK Zabok players
KK Zadar players
Liga ACB players
People from Široki Brijeg
Rosa Radom players